Cathy Féchoz  (born 23 May 1969) is a French freestyle skier. 

She competed at the FIS Freestyle World Ski Championships 1991, where she won a bronze medal in acroski (ski ballet). She won a second bronze medal in ski ballet at the FIS Freestyle World Ski Championships 1991 in Altenmarkt-Zauchensee.

She took part at the 1992 Winter Olympics in Albertville, placing second in the ski ballet, which was a demonstration event at the games.

References

External links 
 

1969 births
Living people
French female freestyle skiers
Université Savoie-Mont Blanc alumni